Oğuz Yılmaz (25 October 1968 – 19 May 2021) was a Turkish folk musician. He was born and raised in Eryaman. He lived and performed most of his life in Sivas, a region of Sivas Province. Therefore, he is also known as "Oguz from Eryaman". His lyrics were controversial, educational and also entertaining. His musical style was a combination of traditional Turkish folk music with Seymen.

Discography 
 Gel Yanıma Gel  
 Kibar Kız 
 Ayaş Yolları
 Dursun 
 Tik Tak 
 Kaynana 
 Tak Zilleri 
 Hanımefendi Mi Oldun? 
 Arabistan Kızları 
 Akşamcı
 Baldız
 Alemci
 Çık Ortaya Gel
 Tırı Vırı
 Sakın 
 Gıdı Gıdı Hatçam 
 Otuz Beşlik Rakı
 Çok Yalvardım Sana 
 Unutma Dostum 
 Dilber 
 Çekirge 
 Yersen  
 Usta (Bas bas paraları Leyla'ya)

References

External links
Biography and Personal Website (Turkish)

1968 births
2021 deaths
Turkish male musicians
Bağlama players
Turkish record producers 
Turkish folk musicians